Thomas Bowers may refer to:

 Thomas Bowers (bishop) (1660–1724), Anglican Bishop of Chichester (England)
 Thomas Bowers (singer) (1826–1885), American singer
 Thomas J. Bowers (1828–1893), chief justice of the Idaho Territorial Court